Ghazi Zaiter (born 1949 in Qasr, Lebanon) is a Shia Lebanese member of parliament representing the Baalbeck-Hermel district. He was Minister of Defense from 1998 to 2000. He also served as Minister of Agriculture, Public Works, Industry and Social Affairs. He is part of the Amal Movement led by Nabih Berri which is part of the opposition after the 2009 election. Ghazi shares 3 kids with Rola: Lama 32, Mohammed 31, and Ziad 27.

Beirut explosion scrutiny 
As part of the 2020 Beirut explosion, Ghazi Zaiter has been under scrutiny since, as Minister of Public Works and Transportation at the time, he had been responsible for dealing with the ship carrying 2,750 tons of ammonium nitrate that docked on Beirut's Port in 2013. In addition, breakthroughs from Al Jadeed's interview with the ship's captain, Boris Prokoshev, have brought to light that the crew's lawyer who helped them abandon the ship in Beirut had been Mohammed Zaiter, Ghazi Zaiter's son. With the explosion of the ship's content in 2020, many have viewed Zaiter's inaction towards the ship as incriminating.

See also
 Lebanese Parliament
 Members of the 2009-2013 Lebanese Parliament
 Amal Movement
 2020 Beirut explosions

References

1949 births
Living people
Members of the Parliament of Lebanon
Lebanese Shia Muslims
Defense ministers of Lebanon
Agriculture ministers of Lebanon
Government ministers of Lebanon
Amal Movement politicians
Beirut Arab University alumni